Karlo Muradori was a Croatian football midfielder.  He won the 1942 Croatian championship with Concordia Zagreb.

References

1914 births
1971 deaths
People from Drvar
Association football forwards
Croatian footballers
Yugoslav footballers
NK SAŠK Napredak players
HŠK Concordia players
NK Lokomotiva Zagreb players